Gyarsilala Rawat is a member of Indian National Congress. Gyarsilal Rawat is a former Member of the Madhya Pradesh Legislative Assembly two-times. Rawat is a current ZP Member of Zila Panchayat Barwani. Gyarsilal Rawat's wife Mrs. Lata bai Rawat is current ZP member and President of District Council Barwani Madhya pradesh.

References

1962 births
Living people
Madhya Pradesh MLAs 1993–1998
Madhya Pradesh MLAs 1998–2003
Indian National Congress politicians from Madhya Pradesh
Madhya Pradesh MLAs 2018–2023